Otto Gmeling or Gmelin, also known as Grand Otto (1876 – 29 October 1925), was a German and president of FC Barcelona from 1909–1910.

He was president of the club when they won their first domestic title, the Copa del Rey in 1910. They also won a Catalan championship undefeated and their first Pyrenees Cup.

Under Gmelings presidency, the club gained a gradual increase in the number of spectators who came to watch the games, which marked the transition from amateur to professional football.

See also
List of FC Barcelona presidents

References

1876 births
1925 deaths
People from Wangen im Allgäu
FC Barcelona presidents
German referees and umpires
Expatriates from the German Empire in Spain